RMIT's School of Media and Communication is an Australian tertiary education school within the College of Design and Social Context at the Royal Melbourne Institute of Technology (RMIT University), located in Melbourne, Victoria.

The school hosts the university's Advertising, Audio/Visual, Creative Writing, Editing and Publishing, Film and Television/ Radio, Journalism, Communication, Music Industry, Professional Communication (a hybrid-degree which crosses Journalism, Media and Public Relations), and Public Relations programs.

The school was formed by the merger of the RMIT School of Creative Media and RMIT School of Applied Communication on 6 July 2009.

Location
The school is headquartered in Building 9 (RMIT's historical radio communications building) on Bowen Street at the RMIT City campus, located in the "RMIT Quarter" at the northern end of the Melbourne CBD. It moved in 2010 from Building 6, but because of its size still has staff in other buildings in the city campus.

AFI Research Collection
The Australian Film Institute (AFI) Research Collection is a non-lending, specialist film and television industry resource. It opened in the mid-1970s as the George Lugg Library, and was a joint venture between the AFI and the Victorian Federation of Film Societies. In 2002 it became an auspice of the RMIT School of Media and Communication, in conjunction with the AFI. In 2020 the AFI Research Collection became part of the RMIT Public Engagement Group.

ARC Centre of Excellence for Automated Decision-Making 
In 2019, it was announced that staff from the School would form the leadership and host a new ARC Centre. In collaboration with other universities, staff won funding for an Australian Research Council (ARC) Centre of Excellence for Automated Decision-Making and Society. The Centre is headed by Professor Julian Thomas. $AU31.8 million in funding was matched by industry and the Centre started in 2020.

RMIT FactLab 
RMIT FactLab is a fact-checking service registered as a research unit under the School of Media and Communication. It was launched in January 2021 with a focus on debunking COVID-19 misinformation. In December 2021, the International Fact Checking Network certified FactLab as a fact-checker.

Notable alumni

Allan Briggs – crisis communication expert and CEO of Crisis Shield
Julian de Stoop – Journalist and former head of Fox Sports News (Melbourne Bureau)
Bob Isherwood – Professional Development Director at The One Club and former Worldwide creative director of Saatchi & Saatchi
Nick Johnston – General Manager Media and Communications at National Basketball League 
Rebecca Maddern – Host of Weekend Today 
Chris Masters, PSM – Walkley and Logie Award winning journalist
Megan Spencer – journalist and documentary film maker
Robert Thomson – Chief Executive of News Corp Australia, former editor of the Wall Street Journal and The Times
James Wan – Film producer and co-creator of the Saw film franchise
Leigh Whannell – Actor, Writer and Producer and co-creator of the Saw film franchise
Andrew Demaria*-Vice President and Executive Creative Director, NBCUniversal Media
Diana Janicki*-META, Head of Creative EMEA Global Business Marketing EMEA region
Brett McLeod -Europe Correspondent, Adjunct Professor Journalism RMIT
Megan Pearson*-Head of Communications, EMEA-GTS & Technology at Bank of America

See also
RMIT University

References

Media and Communication
Film schools in Australia
Animation schools in Australia
Audio engineering schools
Broadcasting schools
Design schools
Digital media schools
Journalism schools in Oceania
Australian journalism organisations